"More to Me" is a song written by Ben Peters, and recorded by American country music artist Charley Pride.  It was released in August 1977 as the first single from the album Someone Loves You Honey.  The song was Pride's 19th number one on the U.S. country singles chart.  The single stayed at number one for one week and spent a total of 11 weeks on the chart.

Chart performance

References

1977 singles
1977 songs
Charley Pride songs
Songs written by Ben Peters
RCA Records singles